Romantically Helpless is a studio album by Holly Cole. It was released in Canada in 2000 on Alert Records and mastered as an HDCD encoded CD.

Track listing

 "One-Trick Pony" (Paul Simon) – 4:41
 "Romantically Helpless" (David Piltch) – 3:31
 "I'll Be Here" (David Baerwald, David Piltch) – 4:36
 "Ghosts" (Randy Newman) – 2:11
 "Come Fly with Me" (Sammy Cahn, Jimmy Van Heusen) – 3:55
 "Dedicated to the One I Love" (Ralph Bass, Lowman Pauling) – 2:53
 "That Old Black Magic" (Harold Arlen, Johnny Mercer) – 3:26
 "If I Start to Cry" (Laura Harding, Jeff Hull) – 4:01
 "Loving You" (Stephen Sondheim) – 3:00
 "Make It Go Away" (Aaron Davis, Laura Harding) – 3:57
 "Don't Fence Me In" (Robert Fletcher, Cole Porter) – 3:16
 "Same Girl" (Randy Newman) – 3:29

Personnel
 Tory Cassis - backing vocals
 David Piltch - bass
 George Koller - bass
 Mark Kelso - drums
 Dave Gray - guitar
 Kevin Breit - guitar
 Kim Ratcliffe - guitar
 Luc Boivin - percussion
 Aaron Davis - piano, organ, synthesizer
 Mark Ferguson - trombone
 Holly Cole - vocals

Production
 Stephen Ferrera - producer
 Bob Ludwig - mastering
 Kevin Killen - mixing
 Jeff Wolpert - engineer

References

Holly Cole albums
2000 albums
Alert Records albums